Kwamie Lassiter II (born January 21, 1998) is an American football wide receiver for the Cincinnati Bengals of the National Football League (NFL). He played college football at Kansas.  He is the son of former NFL player Kwamie Lassiter.

College career 
Lassiter caught 148 passes for 1,550 yards and seven touchdowns in five seasons at Kansas, earning two All-Big 12 honorable mentions.

Professional career

Cincinnati Bengals 
Lassiter went undrafted in the 2022 NFL Draft. He signed with the Cincinnati Bengals on May 13, 2022. Lassiter was elevated to the active roster on November 26, 2022. He signed a reserve/future contract on January 31, 2023.

References 

1998 births
Living people
People from Chandler, Arizona
Players of American football from Arizona
American football wide receivers
Kansas Jayhawks football players
Cincinnati Bengals players
African-American players of American football
21st-century African-American sportspeople